Gibberula abyssicola is a species of very small sea snail, a marine gastropod mollusk or micromollusk in the family Cystiscidae.

Description
The length of the shell attains 3.2 mm.

Distribution
This species occurs in the Atlantic Ocean off Morocco; also in the Bay of Biscay.

References

 Locard, A., 1897 Mollusques testacés. In: Expéditions scientifiques du Travailleur et du Talisman pendant les années 1880, 1881, 1882, 1883, vol. 1, p. 516 p, 22

External links
  Serge GOFAS, Ángel A. LUQUE, Joan Daniel OLIVER,José TEMPLADO & Alberto SERRA (2021) - The Mollusca of Galicia Bank (NE Atlantic Ocean); European Journal of Taxonomy 785: 1–114
 MNHN, Paris: lectotype

abyssicola
Gastropods described in 1897